École secondaire catholique Champlain (E.S.C Champlain) is a French Catholic school in the region of Chelmsford, Ontario.  Champlain is a secondary school owned and operated by the Conseil scolaire de district catholique du Nouvel-Ontario.  The school has an estimated 300 students ranging from grade 9 to grade 12.

See also
List of high schools in Ontario

External links
 School information

High schools in Greater Sudbury
Catholic secondary schools in Ontario
French-language high schools in Ontario
Educational institutions in Canada with year of establishment missing